Isa Knox is a South Korean cosmetics company. It is owned by LG Household & Healthcare Ltd. Celebrity endorsements include Hyori Lee and Jessica Alba.

References

External links
Official site

Cosmetics companies of South Korea
Cosmetics brands of South Korea